The Health Insurance Fund of the Republic of North Macedonia (Macedonian: Фонд за здравствено осигурување на Република Северна Македонија (ФЗОРСМ), Fond za zdravstveno osiguruvanje na Republika Severna Makedonija) is a Macedonian institution which performs as the only state insurance organisation in North Macedonia.

It is largely funded through payroll contributions, with some help from the Pension Fund, the Unemployment Fund and general government revenue.

References

Medical and health organizations based in North Macedonia